Hugo Gamboa (born 3 August 1958) is a Colombian former equestrian. He competed in two events at the 1992 Summer Olympics.

References

External links
 

1958 births
Living people
Colombian male equestrians
Olympic equestrians of Colombia
Equestrians at the 1992 Summer Olympics
Place of birth missing (living people)
20th-century Colombian people
21st-century Colombian people